Nicola Cosentini (born 14 June 1988) is an Italian footballer who plays as a midfielder for Brutium Cosenza.

Career

Lega Pro
Cosentini started his career working his way through the Juventus F.C. youth ranks, before he made his way to the Primavera youth squad in 2006. He never managed a senior team debut with Juventus during the season, but after graduating the youth team in July 2008, he was loaned to Pro Patria, then sold to third division club, A.S. Figline in co-ownership deal, along with teammates, Marco Duravia, Salvatore D'Elia (loan), and Alessandro D'Antoni. He scored 1 goal in 16 appearances for the club during the 2009–10 Lega Pro Prima Divisione season. On 25 June 2010 Juventus brought back Cosentini and sold to Viareggio on 8 July 2010 along with Carlo Pinsoglio, D'Antoni and Giorgio Merlano. In June 2011 Juventus gave up the remain 50% registration rights. However Cosentini also excluded from the squad of Viareggio and terminated the contract in mutual consent in December 2011

Serie D
Cosentini spent rest of the 2011–12 Serie D season with Pro Imperia. He joined another Serie D team Asti in August but later left for Taranto. In December he moved to Montalto Uffugo.

Abroad
He moved to Lithuanian A lyga club Kruoja Pakruojis in March 2013 but due to difficult financial circumstances of the club, in April 2013 he chose to join another Lithuanian A lyga club Tauras Tauragė.

Parma
Cosentini returned to Italy for Parma. Circa October he was signed by Maltese club Mosta. On 31 January 2014 he was signed by Italian fourth division club Gavorrano in co-ownership.

Lega Pro
In July 2014 Cosentini was signed by Savona. In January 2015 he was signed by L'Aquila.

On 23 August 2016 he was signed by Rieti.

Later career
In July 2019, Cosentini joined Brutium Cosenza.

References

External links

 
 

Italian footballers
Italian expatriate footballers
Association football midfielders
Italy youth international footballers
Sportspeople from Cosenza
1988 births
Living people
Juventus F.C. players
Aurora Pro Patria 1919 players
F.C. Esperia Viareggio players
Taranto F.C. 1927 players
Asti Calcio F.C. players
FK Tauras Tauragė players
Parma Calcio 1913 players
Mosta F.C. players
U.S. Gavorrano players
Savona F.B.C. players
L'Aquila Calcio 1927 players
F.C. Rieti players
Serie C players
Serie D players
Maltese Premier League players
A Lyga players
Italian expatriate sportspeople in Lithuania
Expatriate footballers in Lithuania
Italian expatriate sportspeople in Malta
Expatriate footballers in Malta
Footballers from Calabria